Cyprus–Serbia relations are considered as strong, due to common European policies and the sharing of Orthodoxy as a common religion. Cyprus has been a supporter of Serbia in its efforts to join the European Union. Likewise, Serbia has been advocating a stable Cyprus after the Turkish invasion in 1974 and supporting a lasting solution to the Cyprus dispute.

Today, Serbia and Cyprus cooperate on foreign policy, finance, military matters and culture.

Modern relations

Kosovo Independence
Cyprus is one of the five European Union countries that does not recognise Kosovo's independence. During its EU presidency, Cyprus has not changed its policy towards Kosovo and continues to support Serbia on its European integration course. The Cypriot Minister of Commerce assessed that Serbia should be given more time to fulfil the European Council and Commission's conditions set for commencement of the accession negotiations. If those conditions are fulfilled, Cyprus will continue to support Serbia.

Accession of Serbia to the European Union
Cyprus supported the Ministry of Foreign Affairs in Belgrade to start EU accession talks by December 2012. The Foreign Minister of Cyprus Erato Kozakou-Marcoullis underlined the Cyprus Presidency's priority on enlargement in a state visit in Belgrade in July 2012, including the Western Balkans region and Serbia.

Church
The Cypriot Orthodox Church has had excellent relations with the Serbian Orthodox Church, including acquiring and giving humanitarian aid to Serbia during the wars. However, these relations have extended also to the Serbian state. Regarding the latter, the Church of Cyprus has supported "Serbian positions even on the matter of the secession of Montenegro from the Federation", as well as supporting Serbia on Kosovo. Likewise, the Serbian Orthodox Church has supported Cypriot national positions on Cyprus. Like the other orthodox churches, the Church of Cyprus does not recognize the self-declared autocephaly of the Macedonian Orthodox Church and considers it part of the Serbian Orthodox Church.

Economic cooperation
Annually, the Cyprus-Serbian Business Association forums take place in Nicosia or Belgrade. The main objective of the Association is to provide effective and practical assistance in engaging and enhancing the economic and trade relations between Cyprus and Serbia. Another purpose of the Association is organizing various events including conferences and seminars in Cyprus and Serbia where business delegations from either country can attend and be advised on existing business opportunities by individuals.

See also
Foreign relations of Cyprus
Foreign relations of Serbia
Cyprus–Kosovo relations
Cyprus-Yugoslavia relations
Yugoslavia and the Non-Aligned Movement

References

External links
 Cyprus Serbia Business Association 

 
Serbia
Bilateral relations of Serbia